The Amazing Race is an American adventure reality game show in which teams of two race around the world (except the Family edition which featured teams of four and was raced entirely in North America). The show premiered on CBS on September 5, 2001 and is hosted by Phil Keoghan, and aired semiannually between fall and late winter/early spring from 2001 until 2016, then annually from 2017 to 2022, before headed back to semiannually in the TV schedule since the 2022–23 television season.

 On February 25, 2020, CBS renewed the series for the thirty-third season, which its filming had been suspended due to the COVID-19 pandemic and continued from September to October 2021, it ran from January 5 to March 2, 2022. On March 9, 2022, CBS renewed the series for the thirty-fourth season, which premiered on September 21, 2022. This made 2022 the first time since 2015 to air two seasons of the show in a single year. In February 2023, CBS announced that the thirty-fifth season, which was filmed 4-5 months prior, would be broadcast in the 2023-24 television season.

Since the second season, episode titles are taken from quotes made by the racers in each episode. Quotes were sometimes altered slightly for humorous effect.

Series overview

Episodes

Season 1 (2001)

Season 2 (2002)

Season 3 (2002)

Season 4 (2003)

Season 5 (2004)

Season 6 (2004–05)

Season 7 (2005)

Season 8: Family Edition (2005)

Season 9 (2006)

Season 10 (2006)

Season 11: All-Stars (2007)

Season 12 (2007–08)

Season 13 (2008)

Season 14 (2009)

Season 15 (2009)

Season 16 (2010)

Season 17 (2010)

Season 18: Unfinished Business (2011)

Season 19 (2011)

Season 20 (2012)

Season 21 (2012)

Season 22 (2013)

Season 23 (2013)

Season 24: All-Stars (2014)

Season 25 (2014)

Season 26 (2015)

Season 27 (2015)

Season 28 (2016)

Season 29 (2017)

Season 30 (2018)

Season 31: Reality Showdown (2019)

Season 32 (2020)

Season 33 (2022)

Season 34 (2022)

Ratings

Notes

References

External links

Lists of American reality television series episodes